Veerasekaran is a 2010 Indian Tamil-language drama film directed by Sathish Kumar. The film features Veerasamar and Amala Paul in the lead roles. Prathap K. Pothan plays a negative role in the film. This was the film debut made by art director, Veerasamar & Amala Paul’s Tamil debut.

Plot 
The film is about an unemployed youngster, Veerasekaran, who travels to Chennai from his village.

Cast
 Veerasamar as Veerasekaran
 Amala Paul as Sugandhi
 Prathap K. Pothan
 M. S. Bhaskar
 Aarthi

Soundtrack

Release and reception 
The film released on March 5 along with Aval Peyar Thamizharasi and Thambikku Indha Ooru. Dinamalar criticized the story. Behindwoods wrote that "The director has tried to infuse a touch of poignancy into the climax, which does not work because one has not been able to connect with the characters throughout the length of the film".

References

External links
 

2010 films
Indian drama films
2010s Tamil-language films
2010 drama films